Matthias Lukas Ginter (born 19 January 1994) is a German professional footballer who plays as a centre-back for Bundesliga club SC Freiburg and the Germany national team.

Club career

Early career
Ginter began his career with SV March before he moved to the youth squad of SC Freiburg for the 2005–06 season. With the under-19 team he won the Under-19 DFB-Pokal in 2011 and 2012.

In January 2012, Ginter trained with Freiburg's first team due, in part, to a loss of several players from the roster during the winter transfer window. On 21 January 2012, Ginter made his professional debut when he was substituted in for Anton Putsila in the 70th minute against fellow relegation battlers FC Augsburg. In the 88th minute of the game, he scored the winning goal from a free-kick by Michael Lumb for his team in the 1–0 victory. The goal, which came two days after Ginter's 18th birthday, made him SCF's youngest Bundesliga goalscorer in the club's history.  The record was previously held by Dennis Aogo. Two days later, on 23 January, Ginter signed a contract to join the first team of SC Freiburg.

Borussia Dortmund
On 17 July 2014 Ginter signed for Borussia Dortmund on a five-year deal. He made his debut on 13 August, playing the full match as they won the DFL-Supercup 2–0 against Bayern Munich at the Westfalenstadion.

Borussia Mönchengladbach
On 4 July 2017, Ginter signed with Dortmund rivals Mönchengladbach on a four-year deal. The move was worth around €17 million.

Return to SC Freiburg
On 4 May 2022, Freiburg (the club where Ginter began his career) announced Ginter's signing from Mönchengladbach on a free transfer ahead of the 2022–23 season.

International career

Youth
Ginter represented the under-21 team at the 2015 European Championship in the Czech Republic, starting all four matches. In their second group match at the Eden Arena in Prague against Denmark, following two Kevin Volland goals, Ginter rounded off the scoring by heading in Amin Younes' cross in the 53rd minute, leading to a 3–0 victory.

Senior

On 5 March 2014, he earned his first cap for the senior national team of his country after coming on as a 90th-minute substitute for Mesut Özil in the 1–0 win over Chile in a friendly match at the Olympiastadion in Berlin. He became the 900th player to be capped by the German national team.

In June 2014, he was named as the youngest player in Germany's 23-man squad for the 2014 FIFA World Cup, which went on to win the tournament, although he did not enter the field of play at any point.

He was part of the squad for the 2016 Summer Olympics, where Germany won the silver medal.

Along with fellow World Cup-winner Shkodran Mustafi and Julian Draxler, Ginter won the 2017 FIFA Confederations Cup.

On 4 June 2018, Ginter was selected in Germany's final 23-man squad for the 2018 FIFA World Cup. He would not play, making him the only outfield player in German football history who participated in two World Cup campaigns without playing a single minute.

Ginter scored his first goal for Germany on 16 November 2019 in a match against Belarus.

On 19 May 2021, he was selected to the squad for the UEFA Euro 2020.

In November 2022, he was named in the final squad for the 2022 FIFA World Cup in Qatar. On 1 December, he made his World Cup debut in his third tournament, coming on as a substitute to Niklas Süle in the 90+3 minute, in a 4–2 win over Costa Rica in the last group stage match.

Personal life
In May 2018, Ginter married his wife Christina. In 2020 their son was born on Ginter's own birthday, 19 January.

In October 2021 the team where Ginter started his career, SV March, renamed their stadium "Matthias-Ginter-Sportpark".

Career statistics

Club

International

As of match played 14 November 2020. Germany score listed first, score column indicates score after each Ginter goal.

Honours
Borussia Dortmund
DFB-Pokal: 2016–17
DFL-Supercup: 2014

Germany
FIFA World Cup: 2014
FIFA Confederations Cup: 2017

Germany Olympic
Summer Olympic Games silver medal: 2016

Individual
 Fritz Walter Medal U18 Gold: 2012
 Fritz Walter Medal U19 Gold: 2013
Germany national team Player of the Year: 2019
kicker Bundesliga Team of the Season: 2019–20
Nickelodeon Kids' Choice Awards – Favorite Football Player (Germany, Austria, & Switzerland) nominee: 2020

References

External links

 
 
 
 
 
 

1994 births
Living people
Sportspeople from Freiburg im Breisgau
Footballers from Baden-Württemberg
German footballers
Germany youth international footballers
Germany under-21 international footballers
Germany international footballers
Association football defenders
SC Freiburg players
Borussia Dortmund players
Borussia Dortmund II players
Borussia Mönchengladbach players
Bundesliga players
3. Liga players
2014 FIFA World Cup players
2017 FIFA Confederations Cup players
2018 FIFA World Cup players
UEFA Euro 2020 players
2022 FIFA World Cup players
FIFA World Cup-winning players
FIFA Confederations Cup-winning players
Olympic footballers of Germany
Footballers at the 2016 Summer Olympics
Medalists at the 2016 Summer Olympics
Olympic silver medalists for Germany
Olympic medalists in football